Dodworth railway station serves the village of Dodworth, in the Metropolitan Borough of Barnsley, South Yorkshire, England.

Originally its immediate next stations were at Silkstone and Summer Lane. Summer Lane was not reopened, and nowadays the next station eastwards is Barnsley.

History
The present Dodworth station was opened on the site of the original, built by South Yorkshire Railway and opened on 1 July 1854, adjacent to the level crossing which took the main Manchester road (the present-day A628 road) through the village. The crossing and the access to the local colliery was controlled from a signal box, of Manchester, Sheffield and Lincolnshire Railway (MS&LR) hipped-roof design, set by the crossing and which was demolished by a derailment on 24 January 1955. The rebuilt box was a brick built, flat roofed affair (this still stands, but is now disused - the crossing is remotely operated from Barnsley Power Signal Box (P.S.B.).

The station was rebuilt by the Manchester, Sheffield and Lincolnshire Railway in the last quarter of the 19th century in their "Double Pavilion" style. This station was closed on 29 June 1959.  Coal traffic from the adjacent mine continued to be dispatched by rail right up until its closure in 1985, but the former sidings have since been lifted and the site redeveloped.

New station
Part of the South Yorkshire Passenger Transport Executive's plan for the line was to reopen the stations at Silkstone (actually at Silkstone Common) and Dodworth. Dodworth was reopened as a single platform station, with car parking facilities from the commencement of the new timetable on 15 May 1989.

The station is unstaffed and has only basic facilities (a waiting shelter, timetable information posters and bench seating).  There is a display screen in the shelter, occasional automatic announcements and a customer help point at the station entrance. The station is “Green tick” so step-free access is available to the platform for those in wheelchairs.

Services
On a Sunday several services are extended to Lincoln central.

Gallery

References

Sources

Railway stations in Barnsley
DfT Category F2 stations
Former Great Central Railway stations
Railway stations in Great Britain opened in 1854
Railway stations in Great Britain closed in 1959
Railway stations in Great Britain opened in 1989
1854 establishments in England
Reopened railway stations in Great Britain
Northern franchise railway stations